Igor Mijajlović (born July 3, 1984) is a Serbian professional basketball player for Borac Zemun of the Second Basketball League of Serbia. He is 1.92 m (6 ft 3 in) in height and plays at the point guard and shooting guard positions.

Career achievements
 KK MZT Skopje
Macedonian League Champion - 2012
Macedonian Cup Winner - 2012
 Silver Medal Universiade games in Bankgok 2007

References

1984 births
Living people
Basketball players from Belgrade
CSU Sibiu players
Kaposvári KK players
KK Borac Zemun players
KK Mašinac players
KK Mega Basket players
KK Metalac Valjevo players
KK Mladost Zemun players
KK MZT Skopje players
KK Radnički KG 06 players
Point guards
SCM U Craiova (basketball) players
Serbian expatriate basketball people in Hungary
Serbian expatriate basketball people in North Macedonia
Serbian expatriate basketball people in Romania
Serbian expatriate basketball people in Slovenia
Serbian men's basketball players